The Thomist is a refereed peer-reviewed Catholic theological and philosophical journal published by the Pontifical Faculty of the Immaculate Conception and the Dominican Fathers Province of St. Joseph and distributed by Catholic University of America Press. It was established in 1939.

The journal publishes both scholarly articles and book reviews. As of 2022, the General Editor of the journal was Fr. Andrew Hofer .

External links 
 CUA webpage
 Editorial website

Quarterly journals
Publications established in 1939
Academic journals published by learned and professional societies
Catholic studies journals
Catholic University of America academic journals
1939 establishments in the United States